Épieds may refer to the following communes in France:

Épieds, Aisne, in the Aisne département
Épieds, Eure, in the Eure département 
Épieds, Maine-et-Loire, in the Maine-et-Loire département
Épieds-en-Beauce, in the Loiret département